Dong Yun (died December 246), courtesy name Xiuzhao, was a Chinese general and politician of the state of Shu Han during the Three Kingdoms period of China. His father, Dong He, also served as an official in Shu. Dong Yun was one of four persons who held positions equivalent to a head of government in Shu from 221 to 253; the other three were Zhuge Liang, Jiang Wan and Fei Yi.

Family background
Dong Yun's ancestors were originally from Jiangzhou (江州; in present-day Chongqing), but they migrated to Zhijiang County in Nan Commandery, which is present-day Zhijiang, Hubei, and designated Zhijiang as their ancestral home.

Dong Yun's father, Dong He, previously served as an official under Liu Zhang, the Governor of Yi Province (covering present-day Sichuan and Chongqing), during the late Eastern Han dynasty before switching allegiance to Liu Bei, the founding emperor of the state of Shu during the Three Kingdoms period.

As an attendant to the crown prince
In 221, after Liu Bei named his son Liu Shan as his crown prince, he appointed Dong Yun as an attendant to the newly anointed heir apparent.

Earning praise from Zhuge Liang
After Liu Shan became emperor of Shu in 223 following his father's death, he appointed Dong Yun as a Gentleman of the Yellow Gate.

In 227, Zhuge Liang, the Imperial Chancellor of Shu, mobilised military forces from throughout Shu in preparation for a large-scale campaign against Shu's rival state Wei in the following year. As the troops gathered at the staging area in Hanzhong Commandery, Zhuge Liang was worried that Liu Shan was still young and not mature enough to make good judgments. He thus decided to put Dong Yun in charge of internal affairs in the Shu capital Chengdu because he believed that Dong Yun would perform his duties in a professional and impartial manner.

In his Chu Shi Biao (literally "memorial on the case to go to war"), Zhuge Liang named Dong Yun, Fei Yi and Guo Youzhi as examples of trustworthy, loyal and competent officials who could provide good advice and assist Liu Shan in governing Shu more effectively.

As a Palace Attendant
Not long later, Zhuge Liang nominated Dong Yun to serve as a Palace Attendant, commissioned him as a General of the Household and put him in command of the huben division of the imperial guards. As his colleague Guo Youzhi, who also held the position of a Palace Attendant, tended to be mild-tempered and non-confrontational when dealing with people, the burden of advising the emperor Liu Shan and speaking up on difficult issues largely rested on Dong Yun's shoulders. Dong Yun performed his duties well and did his best to plan ahead and preempt problems that could possibly arise.

Objecting to Liu Shan's plan to expand his harem
When Liu Shan wanted to have more concubines, Dong Yun pointed out that his imperial harem was already full and reminded him that according to historical precedent a ruler should have no more than 12 women in his harem. He also firmly refused to carry out the emperor's order to search for more women to join the harem. Liu Shan, unable to get what he wanted, resented and feared Dong Yun.

Rejecting a peerage
Jiang Wan, the Prefect of the Masters of Writing and Inspector of Yi Province, once wrote a memorial to Liu Shan to express his wish to step down and let Fei Yi and Dong Yun succeed him. He also wrote: "(Dong) Yun has served in the palace for many years and done his best to support and uphold the dynasty. He should be awarded a peerage to honour him for his contributions." However, Dong Yun declined to accept a peerage.

Keeping Huang Hao in check

As Liu Shan grew older, he started to favour the palace eunuch Huang Hao, who actively fawned on the emperor in a concerted attempt to rise to higher positions and gain greater power in the Shu government. When Dong Yun learnt about this, he openly criticised the emperor for showing favouritism towards Huang Hao and, at the same time, severely reprimanded the eunuch for his behaviour. Huang Hao feared Dong Yun so he did not dare to cause any trouble; he also never made it to any position higher than that of an Assistant of the Yellow Gate while Dong Yun was still alive.

Treating his colleagues with respect
On one occasion, when Dong Yun was about to leave his residence for a casual hang-out with his friends Fei Yi, Hu Ji and others, he heard that a junior colleague, Dong Hui, had come to visit and consult him. After seeing that Dong Yun already had an appointment and was about to board the carriage, Dong Hui said he would come back again another time and prepared to leave.

Dong Yun stopped him and said: "I am just hanging out with my friends. I think you made a trip here to share some brilliant ideas with me. It would be rude of me to ignore you just so that i can go out with my friends." He then got off the carriage. Fei Yi and the others also cancelled their hang-out. Dong Yun earned praise for his courteous and respectful attitude towards his colleagues and people of talent.

As Prefect of the Masters of Writing
Dong Yun was given the additional appointment of General Who Assists the State in 243. In the following year, he was promoted to the position of Prefect of the Masters of Writing while concurrently holding the appointment of a Palace Attendant. He also served as a deputy to Fei Yi, who held the position of General-in-Chief.

Death and legacy
Dong Yun died in 246. At the time, the people of Shu named Zhuge Liang, Jiang Wan, Fei Yi and Dong Yun as the four heroic chancellors of their state.

After Dong Yun's death, Chen Zhi, whom the Shu emperor Liu Shan favoured, replaced him as a Palace Attendant. Chen Zhi then formed an alliance with the eunuch Huang Hao to dominate the political scene in Shu. Both of them shared power until Chen Zhi died in 258, leaving Huang Hao solely in control. Since Chen Zhi became one of his most favoured officials, Liu Shan gradually began to resent Dong Yun and see him as "arrogant and disrespectful". Chen Zhi and Huang Hao also often spoke ill of Dong Yun in front of Liu Shan and make the emperor hate Dong Yun even more. Dong Yun's death marked the beginning of Huang Hao's rise to power and a trend of increasing corruption in the Shu government. The people of Shu longed to return to the times when Dong Yun was in power.

Descendants
Dong Yun's grandson, Dong Hong, served as the Administrator of Baxi Commandery during the Jin dynasty.

Appraisal
Chen Shou, who wrote Dong Yun's biography in the Records of the Three Kingdoms (Sanguozhi), appraised Dong Yun as follows: "Dong Yun rectified his lord when he was in the wrong and righteousness was manifested in his countenance... Along with Dong He, Liu Ba, Ma Liang and Chen Zhen, he was one of the best officials in Shu."

See also
 Lists of people of the Three Kingdoms

Notes

References

 Chen, Shou (3rd century). Records of the Three Kingdoms (Sanguozhi).
 
 Pei, Songzhi (5th century). Annotations to Records of the Three Kingdoms (Sanguozhi zhu).
 

Year of birth unknown
246 deaths
Politicians from Hubei
Political office-holders in Sichuan
Shu Han generals
Shu Han politicians
Shu Han regents